Gareth Daley, known mononymously as Daley, is a British singer-songwriter and artist. He first became prominent after co-writing and featuring on the Gorillaz single "Doncamatic", having been spotted by the band's creator Damon Albarn early in his career as an underground artist on the UK music scene.

After signing with Universal Music, Daley achieved Billboard chart success with the singles Alone Together with Marsha Ambrosius (of Floetry), the Pharrell Williams-produced Look Up and Until The Pain Is Gone featuring three time Grammy winner Jill Scott.

Early life
Daley was born and brought up in the suburbs of South Manchester in the North-West of England. Before pursuing music professionally, a passion for the creative visual arts led him to study Design & Art Direction at Manchester Metropolitan University, and work as a Graphic Designer, video editor and animator. He lived in Manchester until age 21, before making the decision to quit his day job and relocate to London to focus solely on making music.

Career

2010: Breakthrough
With some early demos, Daley took to the UK live scene, performing at open-mic nights, jam sessions and new talent stages including 'Troy Bar' in Hoxton, 'iluvlive' in Camden and widely respected music industry showcase 'Wired' at Shoreditch House. He would often find himself on stages with fellow emerging artists Ed Sheeran, Jessie J, Emeli Sande and Maverick Sabre - many of whom he has since collaborated or toured with.

Steadily making a name for himself, Daley caught the attention of Gorillaz co-creator Damon Albarn, who invited him to meet and work on new material for the animated band's Plastic Beach album, resulting in their 2011 single "Doncamatic", which Daley co-wrote and fronted as lead vocalist. He subsequently joined the Escape to Plastic Beach World Tour, along with Little Dragon, De La Soul, Lou Reed and Snoop Dogg.

The collaboration enhanced Daley's visibility within the music industry, and early radio airplay started largely at BBC Radio 1Xtra, who's DJ's Twin B, Ras Kwame, MistaJam and Ronnie Herel all championed the singer. This eventually lead to him taking part in emerging artist discovery platform BBC Introducing, where he was invited to record three of his songs at the world-famous Maida Vale Studios in London, and began to attract the attention of record labels.

2011: Those Who Wait
Daley's first solo offering was the Those Who Wait mixtape in late 2011, an independently released free download that was distributed through his official website Daley.TV. The mixtape achieved 50,000 downloads in its first month, increasing to 150,000 downloads over the months that followed and garnered Daley support from UK media including BBC's 'Sound of...' poll and online buzz from bloggers and fans alike. It consisted of ten songs, and showcased an alternative R&B sound. Stand out tracks included "Those Who Wait", "Game Over", "Smoking Gun", and an acoustic cover of 'Maxwell's "Pretty Wings", which became a viral favourite.

2014: Days + Nights
Released on 11 February 2014 by Polydor Records in the United Kingdom and Republic Records in the United States - the critically acclaimed Days + Nights was Daley's official debut studio album. Featuring stand out songs 'Look Up', 'Broken', 'Time Travel' and 'Blame The World', the album featured collaborations with Pharrell Williams, Illangelo, Bernard Butler and Shea Taylor.

2017: The Spectrum
On 14 July 2017, after a two-year hiatus, Daley's sophomore studio album The Spectrum was released via BMG Rights Management. The album featured lead single "Until The Pain Is Gone" a duet with three time Grammy winner Jill Scott). and the Prince-inspired funk jam "Sympathy" with UK producer/DJ Swindle, "Selfish" produced by Montreal producer 'xSdtrk' and UK Garage inspired "Careless"

Discography

Albums

EPs

Singles

Appearances

Touring and live performances
Daley has embarked on several sold-out headline tours around the US and Europe, notably playing London's KOKO, to New York's Apollo Theatre and Highline Ballroom, the El Rey Theatre in Los Angeles, 930 Club in Washington, D.C. and the Buckhead Theatre in Atlanta.

Other artists he has performed and toured with include Stevie Wonder, Gorillaz, Miguel, Jessie J, Emeli Sande, Maxwell, Jill Scott, Maverick Sabre, Kelly Rowland, Earth, Wind & Fire and Quincy Jones.

Headline tours
 Days & Nights Tour (2014) Headline US Tour (30 dates)
 Daley, Unplugged Tour (2014) Headline US Tour (15 dates)
 Look Up Tour (2013) Headline US Tour (18 dates)
 Those Who Wait Tour (2012) Headline European Tour (15 dates)
 2016 tour (2016) Headline USA (18 dates)
 Daley, The Spectrum Tour (2017) Headline US & Europe Tour (25 dates)
 The Spectrum Unplugged Tour (2018) Headline US Tour (18 dates)
 Daley x JMSN (2019) Co-Headline US Tour (18 dates)

Support tours
 Maxwell Summer Solstice Tour Opening act
 Miguel UK Tour Opening act
 Emeli Sande UK Tour Opening act
 Maverick Sabre UK Tour Opening act
 Gorillaz Plastic Beach World Tour Featured artist

References

External links
Official Website www.daley.tv
Daley on Facebook

Year of birth unknown
Living people
English pop singers
English male singer-songwriters
Musicians from Manchester
British contemporary R&B singers
English soul musicians
21st-century English singers
21st-century British male singers
Year of birth missing (living people)